Beatmania IIDX 16: Empress is the 16th game in the Beatmania IIDX series of music video games. It was released in arcades by Konami on November 19, 2008 (11 months since the arcade release of Beatmania IIDX 15: DJ Troopers). The game features over 50 new songs, some of which are unlocked over Konami's e-Amusement platform. The design of Empress's interface is based on a pink color scheme, dominated by sparkles, butterfly wings, and motifs of royalty and jewellery. A PlayStation 2 port for the game was released on October 15, 2009 in Japan.

Gameplay

Beatmania IIDX tasks the player with performing songs through a controller consisting of seven key buttons and a scratchable turntable. Hitting the notes with strong timing increases the score and groove gauge bar, allowing the player to finish the stage. Failing to do so depletes the gauge until it is empty, abruptly ending the song.

The core gameplay remains the same in Empress. A new hidden modifier called "ALL-SCRATCH" changes most of the notes into scratches. More tutorials have been added to the Tutorial mode from DJ Troopers. Many sound effects in the user interface have also been changed. A new mode that is introduced before DJ Troopers CS, "Hazard Mode", instantly fails the player if a combo is broken many times (effectively requiring a full combo in order to pass the stage). To access this mode, All the black buttons must be pushed (when highlighting Free mode in mode selection) to activate the Hazard mode.

The upgrade to Empress also comes with a new turntable design, which has been built to be easier to trigger, and also features a more textured surface.

e-Amusement

More advanced statistics can be accessed through e-Amusement's online components. Jewels can be collected for the Empress Place system using e-Amusement.

Empress Place
Empress Place is the Extra Wtage system used by Empress. During regular play, players randomly accumulate colored jewels (the algorithm has not been disclosed). These jewels are used to unlock the 3 songs, each song representing a famous empress. The 3 songs are Kung-fu Empire by 飛燕流舞 (Consort Yang Yuhuan), Arabian Rave Night by dj MAX STEROID (Cleopatra), and Marie Antoinette by Marguerite du Pre {Marie Antoinette}. When all songs have been cleared with an AAA rating using te HARD option and the player is playing on ANOTHER, then the player would have the opportunity to play the One More Extra Stage, 卑弥呼 by 朱雀 VS 玄武 {Himiko}.

Music

New songs

*1 NΦ CRIME had 2 versions in Empress.
*2 was originally only playable in Beginner mode. A patch over e-Amusement unlocked it for regular play.

Sources:

Home version
The home version was released on October 15, 2009. Unlike previous home versions, the home version of Beatmania IIDX 16: Empress contains two discs. The first one is the EMPRESS disc, which contains songs from the arcade version, home version-originals, and some revivals. The second, called PREMIUM BEST disc, contains the rest of the revivals which were selected from the whole Beatmania IIDX series games. Each disc contains 99 songs, adding the total to 198 songs. It was the final version of Beatmania IIDX to be released on the PlayStation 2.

CS-exclusive songs

Removals and revivals
35 songs were removed in total from Empress. Major removals include the remaining songs by Reo Nagumo, BeForU, and BeForU's members. Nagumo had left Konami in 2006, and BeForU had also recently signed into a new recording contract with Avex Group in the same year, officially severing their ties with Konami. However, their first single under Avex, Red Rocket Rising - which was also removed, appeared in Gold. Other removals include the DJ Yoshitaka remix of I'm In Love Again, which also would not appear in the console version of DJ Troopers. No reasons have been given for the removals.

On the contrary, many songs by Takehiko "Slake" Fujii have been revived. Make A Difference from Beatmania IIDX 9th Style had also been revived, and it had received new Hyper and Another charts. SOLITON BEAM had also received new charts.

References

External links
Official Beatmania IIDX 16: Empress website 

2008 video games
Arcade video games
Beatmania games
Multiplayer and single-player video games
PlayStation 2 games
Video games developed in Japan
Japan-exclusive video games